Tanya Pointer, also known as Nonchalant ( born October 18, 1970) is an American female rapper, and songwriter from Washington, D.C. who was signed to MCA Records.

Nonchalant is best known as Nassim

for her hit single "5 O'Clock", which peaked at number 24 on the US Billboard Hot 100 and was eventually certified gold by the RIAA, for sales of over 500,000 copies. It peaked at number 44 in the UK Singles Chart in June 1996. Her debut album, Until the Day, was released on March 26, 1996, and while it received positive reviews, it failed to match the success of its lead single, reaching number 94 on the US Billboard 200. After her album ran its course, Nonchalant appeared on the song "Keep on Pushin'" from the Dangerous Ground soundtrack alongside fellow rappers MC Lyte, Yo-Yo and Bahamadia. She released a single entitled "Take It There" in 1998, but after it failed to catch on, she was dropped from MCA. Her last appearance was on the Half Baked soundtrack on the song entitled "Flyin'". She largely disappeared from the hip hop circuit by 2001, but returned in 2013 as a DJ.

Discography

Albums

Singles

References

External links 

1970 births
Living people
American women rappers
African-American women rappers
Musicians from Washington, D.C.
MCA Records artists
21st-century American rappers
21st-century American women musicians
21st-century African-American women
21st-century African-American musicians
20th-century African-American people
20th-century African-American women
21st-century women rappers